The 2015 China Open Super Series Premier was the eleventh Super Series tournament of the 2015 BWF Super Series. The tournament was contested in Fuzhou, China from November 10 to November 15, 2015 with a total purse of $700,000. A qualification occurred to fill four places in three disciplines of the main draws.

Players from twenty-one nations competed. The winners were: Lee Chong Wei of Malaysia (Men's Singles); Li Xuerui of China (Women's Singles); Kim Gi-jung & Kim Sa-rang of South Korea (Men's Doubles); Tang Yuanting & Yu Yang of China (Women's Doubles); and Zhang Nan & Zhao Yunlei of China (Mixed Doubles).

Players by nation

Men's singles

Seeds

Top half

Bottom half

Finals

Women's singles

Seeds

Top half

Bottom half

Finals

Men's doubles

Seeds

Top half

Bottom half

Finals

Women's doubles

Seeds

Top half

Bottom half

Finals

Mixed doubles

Seeds

Top half

Bottom half

Finals

References 

China Open (badminton)
China Open Super Series Premier
China Open Super Series Premier
Sport in Fuzhou